Richard J Fateman (born November 4, 1946) is a professor emeritus of computer science at the University of California, Berkeley.

He received a BS in Physics and Mathematics from Union College in June, 1966, and a Ph.D. in Applied Mathematics from Harvard University in June, 1971.  He was a major contributor to the Macsyma computer algebra system at MIT and later to the Franz Lisp system.  His current interests include scientific programming environments; computer algebra systems; distributed computing; analysis of algorithms; programming and measurement of large systems; design and implementation of programming languages; and optical character recognition. In 1999, he was inducted as a Fellow of the Association for Computing Machinery.

Richard Fateman is the father of musician Johanna Fateman.

References

External links 

 Home page.
 

Living people
Union College (New York) alumni
Harvard University alumni
UC Berkeley College of Engineering faculty
Fellows of the Association for Computing Machinery
Programming language researchers
1946 births
Lisp (programming language) people
Amateur radio people